Irkutsk International Airport  (Russian: Международный Аэропорт Иркутск)  is an international airport on the outskirts of Irkutsk, Russia, at a distance of 60 kilometers (37 miles) from Lake Baikal.

Operations
The airport has daily domestic flights to Moscow, Vladivostok, Krasnoyarsk, Novosibirsk, Yakutsk, Saint Petersburg, Yekaterinburg, and Sochi.  It has regional daily flights to Ust-Kut, Bratsk, Bodaybo, Kirensk and other Russian cities.

Due to its proximity to the Angara Reservoir, the airport is subject to a microclimate of foggy weather. When the airport is closed due to bad weather conditions, Bratsk Airport, Ulan-Ude Airport, Irkutsk Northwest Airport, and Belaya (air base) serve as diversion airports.

History

1920s to 1930s 
The Irkutsk Airport opened on 24 June 1925.  Six aircraft from Moscow landed at the airport as part of a flight to Beijing. Of these six planes, four were domestic and two were foreign. This flight was headed by captain I.P. Shmidt. The event was the beginning of aviation service in Siberia.

On 10–13 August 1928 the first postal/passenger flight on the Irkutsk–Bodaybo seaplane route arrived.  It was a Junkers F 13 named Mossovet. In August 1932 the air route from Moscow to Vladivostok opened with a stop in Irkutsk. Irkutsk aviators started to fly the Irkutsk to Mogocha route.

1940s to 1960s 
In January 1948, daily flights on the Irkutsk–Moscow, Irkutsk–Bodaybo–Yakutsk air routes were started.  On December 30, 1954, Irkutsk Airport was elevated to international status.

On September 15, 1956, the Tupolev Tu-104 first arrived in Irkutsk by tech-flight from Beijing. The Moscow–Irkutsk route initiated that day marked the first Soviet jet-airliner-operated passenger route. The flight was performed by a Moscow crew headed by captain E.P. Barabash.

1970s to 1990s 
On March 7, 1975, the first Tupolev Tu-154 jets landed in Irkutsk. On April 4, 1975, the first flight to Moscow on Tupolev Tu-154 was performed.

On November 11, 1980, the first Il-76 CCCP-76525 arrived in Irkutsk. The crew consisted of: flight instructor МГА Mr. M. V. Ptitsyn, the commander УТО Mr. V. F. Podshivalov, captain-probationer A.V. Bobylkov and other flying experts. On December 19, 1980, the first flight was performed on the route Irkutsk–Polyarnyi using the Il-76.  It was headed by air detachment commander Mr. v. I. Sviridov.

On April 1, 1992, according to order No. 238 d.d. 30 March, Irkutsk United Air Group was reorganized. There were Irkutsk Airport State Enterprise (SE "Irkutsk Airport") and Air company Baikal Public Corporation.

On October 28, 1994, certificate No. 045-А-М from the Intergovernmental Aviation Committee for accordance with certification requirements was given. The airport was accepted as suitable for international flights.

On December 16, 1994, the acting terminal of international flights was put into commission.

2000s 
On April 12, 2002, the aerodrome operator changed its name to Irkutsk Airport Federal State Unitary Enterprise.

On July 14, 2004, the aerodrome received its certificate to accept international flights and landing-minimum 1 category ICAO 60.

On October 14, 2008, the work for lengthening the runway (400 m towards Lake Baikal) was completed.

The domestic terminal was re-opened on April 10, 2009, after reconstruction. The terminal is called Crystal Gate.

Irkutsk International Airport held its first aircraft spotting session on November 13, 2009, becoming the third large city in Russia (after Moscow and Novosibirsk). The event has become a tradition.

On July 2, 2010, Irkutsk Airport celebrated its 85th anniversary.

On March 1, 2011, Federal State Unitary Enterprise Irkutsk Airport became the open joint-stock company International airport Irkutsk.

Technical characteristics

 
Irkutsk International Airport has a rather unusual layout, with the passenger terminals being off the western end of the airfield's only runway, at an exact 270° heading. The total capacity of the two passenger terminals is 1450 passengers per hour. For loads up to 30 tons, the cargo terminal has at its disposal diesel forklifts, hoists, a container platform, and electronic/mechanical weigh scales. The airport complex also includes the Air Harbour airport hotel, a service of aviation service (board food workshop) repair facility and medical services. There is a VIP lounge in the international terminal building.

Passenger capacity:
 Domestic terminal: 800 passengers/hour
 International terminal: 650 passengers/hour

Cargo terminal: area = 2.2 hectares with a capacity of 150 tonnes per day.

Fire fighting equipment: cat VIII

Runway characteristics
The class of the artificial landing strip - B (according to the length of the landing strip), corresponding to the first category of ICAO.

ETOPS Diversion airport
Irkutsk airport serves as a diversion airport for transcontinental flights and Polar route 2.

Airlines and destinations

Passenger

Cargo

Statistics

Ground transport 
The airport is located within the city limits. At the airport there are two paid parking areas: 180 spaces (near the international terminal) and 80 spaces (near the domestic airline terminal).

The air terminals are equipped with three stops for complex urban public transport. In addition, shuttle bus number 306 has a route to Angarsk which runs three times a day (2010 data).

Periodical literature
The airport publishes its own regional industry newspaper, Irkutsk Sky, dedicated to civil aviation in the Irkutsk region. The publication contains interviews with the heads of airlines, an airline news column, and analytical materials. The newspaper is published bimonthly and distributed free in the airport terminals and the airlines' offices in Irkutsk.

Accidents and incidents
 On 25 July 1971, Aeroflot Flight 1912 crashed after it touched down short of the runway.  97 of the 118 people on board perished in the crash.  Of the 126 people on board the aircraft, 29 survived.
 On 9 February 1976, Aeroflot Flight 3739 crashed shortly after takeoff.  Of the 115 people on board, 24 perished in the accident.
 On 4 July 2001, Vladivostok Air Flight 352 rolled sharply, stalled and crashed whilst on approach into Irkutsk. All 145 people on board were killed.
 On 9 July 2006, S7 Airlines Flight 778 overshot the runway, and crashed through a concrete barricade, hit a group of private garages and burst into flames, killing 125 out 203 people on board.  The only runway had to be closed, and incoming planes were diverted to the runway of the nearby Irkut aviation plant, where Sukhoi fighters and the Beriev Be-200 are produced.
 On 1 July 2016, an IL-76 belonging to the Ministry of Emergency Situations (EMERCOM) of the Russian Federation, which took off from Irkutsk International airport, crashed in the early morning near Lake Baikal on its way to fight a forest fire in the area. All ten people on board were members of EMERCOM, and there were no survivors.

See also

List of the busiest airports in Russia
List of the busiest airports in the former USSR

References

External links

Official Website International Airport Irkutsk  

Airports built in the Soviet Union
Airports in Irkutsk Oblast
Airports established in 1925